Nanohyla nanapollexa is a species of frog in the family Microhylidae. It is also known as the no-thumb pigmy frog and three-fingered pigmy narrow-mouth frog. It is endemic to Vietnam and is known from Quang Nam and Phu Yen Provinces.

Taxonomy 
N. nanapollexa was formerly placed in the genus Microhyla, but a 2021 study using morphological and phylogenetic evidence moved nine species (including N. nanapollexa) to a new genus, Nanohyla.

Habitat and conservation
N. nanapollexa is considered data deficient by the IUCN Red List.

References

nanapollexa
Amphibians of Vietnam
Endemic fauna of Vietnam
Amphibians described in 2004
Taxonomy articles created by Polbot